Chad Forcier is an assistant coach for the Milwaukee Bucks of the National Basketball Association (NBA).

Career 
Forcier attended Seattle Pacific University, graduating in 1995. During his time in college, he started his coaching career, joining the Seattle SuperSonics of the National Basketball Association (NBA) as an intern in 1992. He spent five seasons with the Sonics, working for head coach George Karl. From 1994 to 1997 Forcier also served as varsity assistant coach and JV head coach at Lake Washington High School in Kirkland, Washington. In 1997, he was named an assistant coach at Oregon State University where he spent three seasons, before moving to the University of Portland to serve as an assistant during the 2000–01 season.

In 2001, Forcier began to work as an assistant coach for Rick Carlisle in the NBA, spending two seasons with the Detroit Pistons (2001–03) and then four with the Indiana Pacers (2003–07). Since 2007 he has served as an assistant coach for the San Antonio Spurs, where he is responsible for player development. In 2014, Forcier won his first NBA championship after the Spurs defeated the Miami Heat in five games. In 2021, Forcier won his second NBA championship after the Bucks defeated the Phoenix Suns in six games.

Personal life 
Forcier's brother, Todd, is the strength and conditioning coach for the University of Kentucky men's basketball team and his sister, Jade Hayes, is the girls’ basketball coach at Bellevue Christian High School in Bellevue, Washington.

References

External links 
 Chad Forcier Info Page at NBA.com

Year of birth missing (living people)
Living people
Detroit Pistons assistant coaches
Indiana Pacers assistant coaches
Memphis Grizzlies assistant coaches
Milwaukee Bucks assistant coaches
Orlando Magic assistant coaches
Oregon State Beavers men's basketball coaches
Portland Pilots men's basketball coaches
San Antonio Spurs assistant coaches
Seattle Pacific University alumni